
Year 751 (DCCLI) was a common year starting on Friday (link will display the full calendar) of the Julian calendar. The denomination 751 for this year has been used since the early medieval period, when the Anno Domini calendar era became the prevalent method in Europe for naming years.

Events 
 By place 

 Byzantine Empire 
 June – Leo IV, son of Emperor Constantine V, is crowned co-emperor at Constantinople. Only a year or so after his mother Irene died, Constantine's second wife Maria dies, at approximately the same time as Leo's coronation.

 Europe 
 November – Pepin the Short, youngest son of Charles Martel, forces the last Merovingian king Childeric III to retire to the monastery of Saint-Bertin. He proclaims himself as king of the Franks with the support of Pope Zachary, and is crowned at Soissons by Boniface, bishop of Mainz, becoming, as Pepin III, the first Carolingian monarch of the Frankish Kingdom.
 King Aistulf of the Lombards captures Ravenna and the Romagna, ending the Byzantine Exarchate of Ravenna. The last exarch Eutychius is killed by the Lombards. Aistulf threatens Rome, claiming a capitation tax. Pope Zachary, alarmed, appeals for aid from the Byzantine Empire, but his request is declined.

 Abbasid Caliphate 
 Battle of Talas: First recorded encounter (and the last) between Arab and Chinese forces. The rulers of Tashkent and Ferghana are both nominal vassals of the Tang Dynasty; the Chinese have intervened on behalf of Ferghana in a conflict between the two; the Abbasid Caliphate, competing with the Chinese for control of Central Asia, has become involved. Arab forces from Samarkand have marched to challenge a Chinese army (30,000 men) under Gao Xianzhi. Gao has had a series of military victories in the region, but his Turkish contingent, Karluk mercenaries, defects. Out of 10,000 Tang troops, only 2,000 manage to return from the Talas River to China. The Arabs triumph, and they will remain the dominant force in Transoxiana for the next 150 years. 
 Muslim introduction of papermaking: The first paper mill in the Islamic world begins production at Samarkand. Captured craftsmen, taken at the Battle of Talas River, have by some accounts revealed the technique of papermaking (although paper may have arrived from China much earlier via the Silk Road). Arab scholars will use paper to produce translations of Ancient Greek and Roman writings.

 Asia 
 Like the storm of 721, the storm of this year at the southern Chinese seaport of Yangzhou reportedly destroys over 1,000 ships engaged in canal and river traffic (approximate date).
 The Japanese poetry anthology Kaifūsō is assembled.

 By topic 

 Religion 
 Kim Daeseong, chief minister of Silla, orders the construction of the Bulguksa and Seokguram temples at Gyeongju (South Korea).
 The oldest surviving printed document, a Buddhist scripture, is printed in Korea.
 Theodore succeeds Theophylact as Orthodox Patriarch of Antioch.
 The Great Buddha at Tōdai-ji in Nara (Japan) is completed.

Births 
 June 28 – Carloman I, king of the Franks (d. 771)
 Adalard of Corbie, Frankish abbot (approximate date)
 Meng Jiao, Chinese poet (d. 814)

Deaths 
 June – Maria, Byzantine empress
 Childebrand I, duke of Burgundy (b. 678)
 Eutychius, Byzantine exarch of Ravenna
 Fergus mac Fogartaig, king of Brega (Ireland)
 Gisulf II, duke of Benevento (approximate date)
 Mansur ibn Jumhur al-Kalbi, Arab governor of Sindh
 Taki, Japanese princess and saiō

References